Raymond Mardon (5 March 1912 – 24 June 1984) was a South African cricketer. He played in fifteen first-class matches for Eastern Province between 1929/30 and 1932/33.

See also
 List of Eastern Province representative cricketers

References

External links
 

1912 births
1984 deaths
South African cricketers
Eastern Province cricketers
People from Makhanda, Eastern Cape
Cricketers from the Eastern Cape